The 7th Macondo Awards ceremony, presented by the Colombian Academy of Cinematography Arts and Sciences, honored the best audiovisual productions of 2018. It took place on November 17, 2018, at the Ágora Bogotá Convention Center in Bogotá. The ceremony awarded 18 categories and was broadcast by Canal Capital.

The film Killing Jesus won the award for Best Film.

Winners and nominees

See also

 List of Colombian films
 Macondo Awards
 2018 in film

References

External links
7th Macondo Awards at IMDb
7th Macondo Awards at Filmaffinity

2018 film awards
2018 in Colombia
Events in Bogotá
Culture in Bogotá